Schlangen is a municipality in the Lippe district of North Rhine-Westphalia, Germany. Schlangen has about 9.000 inhabitants (2013) and enjoys relative prosperity. Located a few kilometers away from Detmold, the municipality stretches from the edge of the sandy Sea  to the mountain course of the Teutoburger forest southern slope.

Politics

The town council of Schlangen consists of 26 members:

(conditions: Local election 2014)

Sister cities
The following cities are twinned with Schlangen:
  Viitasaari, Central Finland, since 1999

References

External links
 Official website 

Lippe
Principality of Lippe